Rose Tynan (born 20 March 1997) is a field hockey player from New Zealand.

Personal life
Rose Tynan was born and raised in Auckland, New Zealand.

She is the granddaughter of Jack Tynan, who also played field hockey and captained the Black Sticks.

Career

Black Sticks
Rose Tynan made her debut for the Black Sticks in 2022, during the Trans–Tasman series in Auckland. Following her debut, she was named in the squad for the FIH World Cup in Amsterdam and Terrassa, as well as the Commonwealth Games in Birmingham.

International goals

References

External links

Rose Tynan at the New Zealand Hockey Federation

1997 births
Living people
New Zealand female field hockey players
Female field hockey forwards
Field hockey players at the 2022 Commonwealth Games